Józef Gawliczek (born 20 January 1939) is a Polish former racing cyclist. He won Tour of Britain and the Tour de Pologne 1966.

References

External links
 

1939 births
Living people
Polish male cyclists
People from Wodzisław County
Sportspeople from Silesian Voivodeship